Pseudoponera is a small genus of ponerine ants. The genus was described by Emery in 1900.

Description
The genus contains a small number of species, preferring Neotropical climates. Despite being a small genus, the species have a worldwide distribution, where they are found in multiple continents.

List of species
There are 6 species belonging to Pseudoponera:
Pseudoponera cognata (Emery, 1896)
Pseudoponera gilberti (Kempf, 1960)
Pseudoponera gilloglyi (MacKay & MacKay, 2010)
Pseudoponera pachynoda (Clark, 1930)
Pseudoponera stigma (Fabricius, 1804)
Pseudoponera succedanea (Roger, 1863)

References

Ponerinae
Ant genera